Alexander MacDonnell may refer to:

Sir Alexander Macdonnell (died 1634), of the Macdonnell baronets of Maye
Sir Alexander Macdonnell, 1st Baronet (1794–1875), of the Macdonnell baronets of Kilsharvan
Alexander MacDonnell, 3rd Earl of Antrim (1615–1699)
Alastair Ruadh MacDonnell (c. 1725–1761), also called Alexander
Alexander Macdonell (bishop of Kingston) (1762–1840), first Roman Catholic bishop of Kingston, Upper Canada

See also
Alexander McDonnell (disambiguation)
Alexander Macdonell (disambiguation)